Birstall Town railway station served the town of Birstall, West Yorkshire, in the historic county of West Riding of Yorkshire, England, from 1900 to 1953 on the Leeds New Line.

History 
The station was opened as Upper Birstall on 1 October 1900 by the London and North Western Railway. It had a passenger subway nearby coal sidings. The station's name was changed to Birstall Town on 8 July 1935. Although the station closed on 1 August 1953, the railway still carried the Transpennine expresses until August 1965. Also, goods traffic finished on the same date - August 1965.

Redevelopment 
The station area is now an industrial estate. West of the station, the Raikes Lane overbridge has since been bricked up. and the cutting west of the station has been filled in. Going east, the bridge over the A62 Gelderd Road was removed 

The line from Birstall to Gildersome came very close now to the M62 Junction 27 Trading Estate, including Ikea, Showcase Cinemas, et al.

References

External links 

Disused railway stations in West Yorkshire
Former London and North Western Railway stations
Railway stations in Great Britain opened in 1900
Railway stations in Great Britain closed in 1953
1900 establishments in England
1953 disestablishments in England
Birstall, West Yorkshire